Mesoglossus pygmaeus is a species of acorn worm in the family Harrimaniidae, which is found in Europe, precisely in British Isles.

References

Animals described in 1938
Invertebrates of Europe
Enteropneusta